The Copa El Salvador 2016–17 is the fifth staging of the Copa El Salvador football tournament and the first was played since the 2014–15 edition when the tournament was known as the Copa Presidente.

This tournament started on 16 October 2016.

Participants 
This tournament will feature all the clubs from the Salvadoran Primera División, 12 from the Segunda División, and 12 from the Tercera División.

Group stage 

Each group was composed of three clubs: one from Primera División, one from Segunda División and one from the Tercera División. The clubs played a double round-robin for a total of four games each. The 12 group winners and top 4 group runners-up advanced to the knockout stage.

Group A

Group B

Group C

Group D

Group E

Group F

Group G

Group H

Group I

Group J

Group K

Group L

Ranking of second-placed teams

Knockout stage

Qualified teams
The twelve group winners and the four best runners-up from the group stage qualify for the final stage.

Universidad de El Salvador were disqualified from this season's competition for failing to complete paperwork to be involved in any division, therefore making them ineligible.

Quarter-finals
The draw for the round 16 was set to occur on 3 April 2017, but was postponed. No date has been set for this round to begin.
Following discussion instead having a round robin competition they decided to change it to a single round knockout quarter finals.
The round included three team from tercera division still in the competition, Juventud Cara Sucia, Sensuntepeque and CD Chaguite who were the lowest-ranked team in this round.

Semi-finals

Preliminary Finals
The draw for the semi-finals was held on 27 October 2017.

The semi-finals were played on 1 and 2 November 2017.

Grand Finals

References 

1